Séminaire Sainte-Marie is a French-speaking and Catholic private school based in Shawinigan, Quebec.

History

The institution was founded in 1950 as an all-boy classical college. In the wake of the education reform implemented during the Quiet Revolution, the Séminaire became a secondary school (middle and high school levels) and opened its doors to female students.

Well until the late 1980s, it offered compulsory Latin studies. The school has been hosting an IB Diploma Programme since 1998.

Prominent alumni

The Séminaire's former students include:

Federal politics
 Jean Chrétien, Prime Minister of Canada from 1993 to 2003
 Gilles Grondin, former Member of the Parliament of Canada

Provincial politics
 Yves Duhaime
 Jean-Pierre Jolivet
 Claude Pinard
 Luc Trudel

Others
 Martin Gélinas, professional ice hockey player
 Éveline Gélinas, actress

External links

Official website
Épisode, L'expertise québécoise en collecte de fonds: Fondation du Séminaire Sainte-Marie, Campagne majeure de financement 2008-2012

High schools in Quebec
Catholic secondary schools in Quebec
Educational institutions established in 1950
Private schools in Quebec
Shawinigan
Education in Mauricie
International Baccalaureate schools in Quebec
1950 establishments in Quebec